TEDA International Cardiovascular Hospital is a specialist cardiovascular hospital in the Binhai New Area of Tianjin, China.

External links 
 

Hospitals in Tianjin